The Rouen Monumental Cemetery is the most important cemetery of the Norman city of Rouen, opened in 1828 and situated to the North-East of the town-centre. The entrance gate, the chapel and the monumental cross are the work of Charles Felix Maillet du Boullay.

Buried people 

 Charles Angrand
 Henry Barbet
 Albert Beaucamp
 Michel Bérégovoy
 Édouard de Bergevin
 François Adrien Boieldieu (cœur)
 Georges Bouctot
 Louis Bouilhet
 Louis Auguste de Bourbel de Montpinçon
 Jean-Baptiste Cécille
 Marcel Couchaux
 Joseph-Désiré Court
 Pierre Chirol
 Jean Benoît Désiré Cochet
 Georges Dubosc
 Marcel Duchamp
 Suzanne Duchamp
 Raymond Duchamp-Villon
 Gustave Flaubert
 Jean Pierre Louis Girardin
 Jacques Hébertot
 Auguste Houzeau
 Eustache-Hyacinthe Langlois
 Albert Lebourg
 Théodore-Éloi Lebreton
 Léon-Jules Lemaître
 Valérius Leteurtre
 Juste Lisch
 Ferdinand Marrou
 Georges Métayer
 Étienne Nétien
 Émile Frédéric Nicolle
 Félix Archimède Pouchet
 Raymond Quenedey
 Augustin Pouyer-Quertier
 Marie Antoine de Reiset
 Jean Revel
 Louis Ricard
 Eugène Richard
 Antoine Sénard
 Jacques Villon
 Francis Yard
 Colette Yver

Cremated people 
 Henri Gadeau de Kerville
 Patrice Quéréel

Bibliography 
 J. Rivage, Le Cimetière monumental, Cagniard, Rouen, 1864
 Jean-Pierre Chaline, « L'Art funéraire expression d'une société ? L'exemple du Cimetière monumental de Rouen », dans Recueil d'études offert en hommage au Doyen M. de Boüard, Annales de Normandie, numéro spécial, Caen, 1982
 Jean-Pierre Chaline, « Mort d'un cimetière ? », in Bulletin des Amis des monuments rouennais, 1993
 Jean-Pierre Chaline (dir.), Mémoire d'une ville, le Cimetière monumental de Rouen, Société des Amis des monuments rouennais, Rouen, 1997

References

External links
 

French cemeteries
Rouen